Bouchercon is an annual convention of creators and devotees of mystery and detective fiction. It is named in honour of writer, reviewer, and editor Anthony Boucher; also the inspiration for the Anthony Awards, which have been issued at the convention since 1986. This page details Bouchercon XVII and the inaugural Anthony Awards ceremony.

Bouchercon
The convention was held in Baltimore, Maryland on October 10, 1986; running for two days until the 12th. The event was chaired by Gail M. Larson, owner of the bookshop "The Butler Did It".

Special Guests
Guest of Honor — Donald E. Westlake
Fan Guest of Honor — Chris Steinbrunner
Toastmaster — Mary Higgins Clark

Anthony Awards
The following list details the awards distributed at the first annual Anthony Awards ceremony.

Novel award
Winner:
Sue Grafton, "B" Is for Burglar

Shortlist:
Sarah Caudwell, The Shortest Way to Hades
John D. MacDonald, The Lonely Silver Rain
Charlotte MacLeod, The Plain Old Man
Sara Paretsky, Killing Orders

First novel award
Winner:
Jonathan Kellerman, When the Bough Breaks

Shortlist:
Susan Kelly, The Gemini Man
Dick Lochte, Sleeping Dog
Robert Reeves, Doubting Thomas
Andrew Vachss, Flood

Paperback original award
Winner:
Nancy Pickard, Say No to Murder

Shortlist:
P.M. Carlson, Murder is Academic
Earl Emerson, Poverty Bay
Kate Green, Shattered Moon
Patrick A. Kelley, Sleightly Murder

Short story award
Winner:
Linda Barnes, "Lucky Penny", from The New Black Mask, No. 3

Shortlist:
Loren Estleman, "Eight Mile and Dequindre", from Alfred Hitchcock's Mystery Magazine May 1986
Peter Lovesey, "Vandals", from Ellery Queen's Mystery Magazine December 1985
John Lutz, "Ride the Lightning", from Alfred Hitchcock's Mystery Magazine January 1985
Ruth Rendell, "The Convolvulus Clock", from Ellery Queen's Mystery Magazine August 1985

Movie award
Winner:
Witness

Shortlist:
Blood Simple
Fletch
Jagged Edge
Young Sherlock Holmes

TV Series award
Winner:
Murder, She Wrote

Shortlist:
Hill Street Blues
Moonlighting
Mystery
Spenser For Hire

Grand Master
Barbara Mertz

References

Anthony Awards
17
1986 in Maryland